Tou is a surname in various cultures.

Origins
Tou may be:
An English surname, recorded in the Domesday Book as the name of a landholder
The Cantonese Jyutping romanisation of the Chinese surname spelled in Mandarin Pinyin as Táo
The Wade-Giles romanisation of various Chinese surnames spelled in Pinyin as Dou
An alternative spelling of the Chinese surname spelled in Pinyin as Tuǒ
A Cambodian surname, spelled in both Geographic Department romanisation and UNGEGN romanisation as Tu

Statistics
As of 2017, 2 people in Denmark and 48 people in Norway bore the surname Tou.

The 2010 United States Census found 312 people with the surname Tou, making it the 63,873rd-most-common name in the country, up from 251 (72,237th-most-common) in the 2000 Census. In both censuses, slightly more than three-quarters of the bearers of the surname identified as Asian, and between 10% and 15% as White.

People
People with the surname Tou include:
Tou Samouth (–1962), Cambodian communist politician
Holger Tou (1919–1947), Norwegian police official and collaborator with Nazi Germany
Tou Chung-hua (born 1962), Taiwanese actor
Drissa Tou (born 1973), Burkinabe boxer

References

Chinese-language surnames